Villanueva de los Infantes is a municipality in the province of Valladolid, Castile and León, Spain.

References

Municipalities in the Province of Valladolid